Blastobasis decolor is a moth in the family Blastobasidae. It was described by Edward Meyrick in 1907. It is found in Sri Lanka.

References

Blastobasis
Moths described in 1907